The 2003 Scottish Parliament election was the second election of members to the Scottish Parliament. It was held on 1 May 2003 and it brought no change in terms of control of the Scottish Executive. Jack McConnell, the Labour Party MSP, remained in office as First Minister for a second term and the Executive continued as a Labour and Liberal Democrat coalition. As of 2022, it remains the last Scottish Parliament election victory for the Scottish Labour Party, and the last time the Scottish National Party lost a Holyrood election.

The results also showed rises in support for smaller parties, including the Scottish Green Party and the Scottish Socialist Party (SSP) and declines in support for the Labour Party and the Scottish National Party (SNP). The Conservative and Unionist Party and the Scottish Liberal Democrats each polled almost exactly the same percentage of the vote as they had in the 1999 election, with each holding the same number of seats as before.

Three independent MSPs were elected: Dennis Canavan, Margo MacDonald and Jean Turner.  John Swinburne, leader of the Scottish Senior Citizens Unity Party, was also elected. This led to talk of a "rainbow" Parliament, but the arithmetic meant that the coalition of Labour and Scottish Liberal Democrats could continue in office, which they did until the 2007 election.

The decline in support for the SNP was viewed by some as a rejection of the case for Scottish independence. Others argued against this, pointing out that the number of MSPs in favour of independence actually rose because most of the minor parties such as the SSP share this position with the SNP.

Retiring MSPs
At the dissolution of Parliament on 31 March 2003, ten MSPs were not seeking re-election.

Campaign
The parliament was dissolved on 31 March 2003 and the campaign began thereafter.

Party leaders in 2003
Labour – Jack McConnell
SNP – John Swinney
Conservative – David McLetchie
Liberal Democrat – Jim Wallace
Greens – Robin Harper & Eleanor Scott (co-chairs)
SSP – Tommy Sheridan

Defeated MSPs

Labour
 Brian Fitzpatrick, Strathkelvin and Bearsden
 Rhoda Grant, Highlands and Islands
 Iain Gray, Edinburgh Pentlands
 Angus MacKay, Edinburgh South
 Richard Simpson, Ochil
 Elaine Thomson, Aberdeen North

SNP
 Kenneth Gibson, Glasgow
 Irene McGugan, North East Scotland
 Fiona McLeod, West of Scotland
 Gil Paterson, Central Scotland
 Lloyd Quinan, West of Scotland
 Michael Russell, South of Scotland
 Andrew Wilson, Central Scotland

The New Party
 Keith Harding, Mid Scotland and Fife (elected as a Conservative)
 Lyndsay McIntosh, Central Scotland (elected as a Conservative)

Results

|-
| style="background-color:white" colspan=15 | 
|-
! rowspan=2 colspan=2 | Party
! colspan=5 | Constituencies
! colspan=5 | Regional additional members
! colspan=5 | Total seats
|-
! Votes !! % !! ± !! Seats !! ± !! Votes !! % !! ± !! Seats !! ± !! Total !! ± !! %
|-

|-
|style="text-align:left"; colspan="2" | Valid votes || 1,916,574 || 99.4 || 0.3 || colspan="2"|   || 1,915,851 || 99.4 || 0.3 || colspan="5"|  
|-
|style="text-align:left"; colspan="2" | Spoilt votes || 12,303 || 0.6 || 0.3 || colspan="2"|   || 11,938 || 0.6 || 0.3 || colspan="5"|  
|-
!style="text-align:left"; colspan="2" | Total || 1,928,877 || 100 ||   || 73 || – || 1,927,789 || 100 ||   || 56 || – || 129 || – || 100
|-
|style="text-align:left"; colspan="2" | Electorate/Turnout || 3,877,460 || 49.7 || 8.7 || colspan="2"|   || 3,877,460 || 49.7 || 8.6 || colspan="5"|  
|}

Notes:

The Scottish Greens did not stand in any constituencies, instead concentrating their resources on winning the largest possible share of the "second" vote for 'list' seats.

Constituency and regional summary

Central Scotland 

|-
! colspan=2 style="width: 200px"|Constituency
! style="width: 150px"|Elected member
! style="width: 300px"|Result
 
 
 
 
 
 
 
 
 
 
 

|-
! colspan="2" style="width: 150px"|Party
! Elected candidates
! style="width: 40px"|Seats
! style="width: 40px"|+/−
! style="width: 50px"|Votes
! style="width: 40px"|%
! style="width: 40px"|+/−%
|-

Glasgow 

|-
! colspan=2 style="width: 200px"|Constituency
! style="width: 150px"|Elected member
! style="width: 300px"|Result
 
 
 
 
 
 
 
 
 
 

|-
! colspan="2" style="width: 150px"|Party
! Elected candidates
! style="width: 40px"|Seats
! style="width: 40px"|+/−
! style="width: 50px"|Votes
! style="width: 40px"|%
! style="width: 40px"|+/−%
|-

Highlands and Islands 

|-
! colspan=2 style="width: 200px"|Constituency
! style="width: 150px"|Elected member
! style="width: 300px"|Result
 
 
 
 
 
 
 
 

|-
! colspan="2" style="width: 150px"|Party
! Elected candidates
! style="width: 40px"|Seats
! style="width: 40px"|+/−
! style="width: 50px"|Votes
! style="width: 40px"|%
! style="width: 40px"|+/−%
|-

Lothians 

|-
! colspan=2 style="width: 200px"|Constituency
! style="width: 150px"|Elected member
! style="width: 300px"|Result
 
 
 
 
 
 
 
 
 
 

|-
! colspan="2" style="width: 150px"|Party
! Elected candidates
! style="width: 40px"|Seats
! style="width: 40px"|+/−
! style="width: 50px"|Votes
! style="width: 40px"|%
! style="width: 40px"|+/−%
|-

Mid Scotland and Fife 

|-
! colspan=2 style="width: 200px"|Constituency
! style="width: 150px"|Elected member
! style="width: 300px"|Result
 
 
 
 
 
 
 
 
 
 

|-
! colspan="2" style="width: 150px"|Party
! Elected candidates
! style="width: 40px"|Seats
! style="width: 40px"|+/−
! style="width: 50px"|Votes
! style="width: 40px"|%
! style="width: 40px"|+/−%
|-

North East Scotland 

|-
! colspan=2 style="width: 200px"|Constituency
! style="width: 150px"|Elected member
! style="width: 300px"|Result
 
 
 
 
 
 
 
 
 
 

|-
! colspan="2" style="width: 150px"|Party
! Elected candidates
! style="width: 40px"|Seats
! style="width: 40px"|+/−
! style="width: 50px"|Votes
! style="width: 40px"|%
! style="width: 40px"|+/−%
|-

South of Scotland 

|-
! colspan=2 style="width: 200px"|Constituency
! style="width: 150px"|Elected member
! style="width: 300px"|Result
 
 
 
 
 
 
 
 
 
 

|-
! colspan="2" style="width: 150px"|Party
! Elected candidates
! style="width: 40px"|Seats
! style="width: 40px"|+/−
! style="width: 50px"|Votes
! style="width: 40px"|%
! style="width: 40px"|+/−%
|-

West of Scotland 

|-
! colspan=2 style="width: 200px"|Constituency
! style="width: 150px"|Elected member
! style="width: 300px"|Result
 
 
 
 
 
 
 
 
 
 

|-
! colspan="2" style="width: 150px"|Party
! Elected candidates
! style="width: 40px"|Seats
! style="width: 40px"|+/−
! style="width: 50px"|Votes
! style="width: 40px"|%
! style="width: 40px"|+/−%
|-

Coalition
As part of the coalition deal between Labour and the Scottish Liberal Democrats, Labour allowed proportional representation (a long-standing Lib Dem policy) to be used in Scottish local government elections. This system was first used in 2007.

Campaign spending

See also
 2nd Scottish Parliament
 2003 National Assembly for Wales election
 2003 United Kingdom local elections

References

Party manifestos
British National Party – Freedom
Pro-Life Alliance
Scottish Liberal Democrats – Make the difference
Scottish National Party – Release our potential
Scottish Socialist Party – another Scotland is possible

External links
BBC: Vote Scotland 2003
Scottish Election Results 1997 – present

2003
2003 elections in the United Kingdom
2003 in Scotland
2000s elections in Scotland
May 2003 events in the United Kingdom